Guy Roger Eschmann Bassono (born 10 June 1992) is a footballer who plays as a midfielder. Born in Togo, he is a naturalised citizen of Switzerland.

Career
Adopted by Swiss parents at the age of 7, Eschmann took part in the 2009 UEFA European Under-17 Championship, but was unable to participate in that year's FIFA U-17 World Cup, which Switzerland won, because to injury.

After failing to make an appearance with RCD Mallorca in the Spanish top flight and a stint in Israel, he signed for Fylkir in Iceland. There, the coach told Eschmann that English and Dutch clubs watched the island and that he reminded him of Aron Jóhannsson, who signed for Dutch team AZ Alkmaar from Iceland.

By 2020, Eschmann was in the process of establishing a football academy in Oman, due to "football there being 20 years behind".

References

External links
 

1992 births
Living people
Sportspeople from Lomé
Adoptees
Togolese emigrants to Switzerland
Naturalised citizens of Switzerland
Swiss men's footballers
Association football midfielders
Association football forwards
SK Slavia Prague players
Switzerland youth international footballers
Swiss expatriate footballers
Swiss expatriate sportspeople in Israel
Expatriate footballers in Israel
Expatriate footballers in Iceland
Swiss expatriate sportspeople in the Czech Republic
Expatriate footballers in the Czech Republic
Swiss expatriate sportspeople in Belgium
Expatriate footballers in Belgium
Swiss people of Togolese descent
Swiss sportspeople of African descent
Swiss expatriate sportspeople in Iceland
Swiss expatriate sportspeople in Spain
RCD Mallorca players
Expatriate footballers in Spain
Togolese expatriate sportspeople in Spain
Togolese expatriate sportspeople in Israel
Togolese expatriate sportspeople in Iceland
Togolese expatriate sportspeople in the Czech Republic
Togolese expatriate sportspeople in Belgium